Aglaia rufibarbis is a small tree in the family Meliaceae. The bark is usually grey and pale brown, sometimes dark brown. The specific epithet  is from the Latin meaning "red beard", referring to the reddish brown hairs of the indumentum. A. rufibarbis is found in Peninsular Malaysia and Borneo.

References

rufibarbis
Plants described in 1917
Trees of Peninsular Malaysia
Trees of Borneo